Ski jumping at the 1996 Asian Winter Games took place in the city of Harbin, China with only two events being contested — both of them men's events. Both events were only for demonstration; the medals gained here did not officially count towards the final medal tally.

Medalists

Medal table

References

External links
FIS official website

 
1996 Asian Winter Games events
1996
Asian Winter Games